Cinoxate is an organic compound used as an ingredient in some types of sunscreens.  It is an ester formed from methoxycinnamic acid and 2-ethoxyethanol.  It is a slightly yellow viscous liquid that is insoluble in water, but miscible with alcohols, esters, and vegetable oils.

See also
 Amiloxate, another methoxycinnamate-based sunscreen
 Octyl methoxycinnamate, another methoxycinnamate-based sunscreen

References

Sunscreening agents
O-methylated phenols
Cinnamate esters